The Harbin–Yichun high-speed railway is a high-speed railway line in Heilongjiang, China.

Route
It will reduce the travel time between Harbin and Yichun from over seven hours to 100 minutes. Construction started on May 13, 2021.

Stations

References

High-speed railway lines in China
High-speed railway lines under construction